R. Madhavan is an Indian actor known for his work predominantly in Tamil and Hindi films, and also in few Telugu, Malayalam and Kannada films. He began his acting career in the early 1990s by featuring in Hindi soap operas like Banegi Apni Baat, Sea Hawks, Ghar Jamai and Saaya. In 2000, Madhavan gained recognition in Tamil cinema by playing the lead role in Mani Ratnam's romantic drama film Alaipayuthey. He followed this with appearances in two commercially successful Tamil films, Gautham Vasudev Menon's directorial debut Minnale (2001) and Madras Talkies' Dumm Dumm Dumm (2001), as well as his first Hindi film in a leading role, Rehnaa Hai Terre Dil Mein (2001).

In the early 2000s, Madhavan worked on Tamil films including Kannathil Muthamittal (2002), Run (2002), Anbe Sivam (2003) and Aaytha Ezhuthu (2004). Madhavan also simultaneously pursued a career in the Hindi film industry, by appearing in supporting roles in films including Rakeysh Omprakash Mehra's Rang De Basanti (2006), Mani Ratnam's biopic Guru (2007) and Rajkumar Hirani's 3 Idiots (2009), which became the highest-grossing Indian film of all time upon release at the time. Other Tamil productions that Madhavan worked on during the late 2000s included Evano Oruvan (2007), which he also produced, and the horror film Yavarum Nalam (2009).

After appearing in Tanu Weds Manu (2011) and Vettai (2012), Madhavan took an extended break from signing new film projects. His comeback films, the romantic-comedy Tanu Weds Manu Returns (2015), the bilingual sports drama Irudhi Suttru (2016) and the crime film Vikram Vedha (2017) all performed well at the box office. His performance as a boorish boxing coach in Irudhi Suttru fetched him Best Actor awards at the Filmfare, IIFA and SIIMA award ceremonies.

Filmography

Films

Other crew positions

Television

Documentaries

Notes

References

Bibliography

External links 
 

Male actor filmographies
Indian filmographies